Alfarook Educational Centre is a multi-discipline campus at Feroke in Kozhikode District, India.

History
Al-Farook Educational Center is a project of the Rouzathul Uloom Association. The college started functioning from 1990 on Karad Road. It is registered under the Registration of Societies Act XI of 1860 approved by the Government of Kerala. IGNOU programmes were launched in 1992. B.A. English course was started in 2003; BBA, B.Com. classes started in 1999. JRF and NET coaching in Physics started in 2010.

Academics

Post-graduate program
 M.C.A. Six semesters. Under Indira Gandhi National Open University.
 M.A. English Four semesters. Under SDE University of Calicut.
 M.Com. Four semesters. Under SDE University of Calicut.

Other courses
 B.C.A. Six Semesters. Under Indira Gandhi National Open University.
 C.I.T. Six Semesters. Under Indira Gandhi National Open University.
 O Level One year. NIELIT
 Tally Six months.
 P.G.D.C.A. 16 months.
 C.P.P. Nine months.

Degree Courses
 B.B.A. Six semesters. Under the University of Calicut.
 B.Com. Six semesters. Under the University of Calicut.
 B.A.English Six semesters. Under the University of Calicut.
 B.A.Economics Six semesters. Under the University of Calicut.
 B.A.Sociology Six semesters. Under the University of Calicut.

Attached organizations
 IGNOU, Study Centre
 Alfarook Computer Center
 Lecturership Training for Physics

See also
 Farook College

References

Colleges in Kerala
Universities and colleges in Kozhikode
Educational institutions established in 1990
1990 establishments in Kerala